Grecotel S. A., part of N. Daskalandonakis Group, is the largest luxury hotel chain in Greece.

As of 2014, the company reported a turnover of 151 million Euro, 1.85 million lodging nights.
Grecotel has a total of 35 hotels as of 2017. Hotels in the Peloponnese and Crete operate from March to mid-November, 
the resort at Cape Sounio (Attic Riviera) is operational until late December.

N. Daskalantonakis Group, the main owner of Grecotel, is a family business, reportedly involved in 60 companies and one of Greece's largest tourism businesses.

German tour operator TUI Group acquired 50% ownership of Grecotel in 1981. 
The brothers Nikos and Takis (1931–2012) Daskalantonakis (Δασκαλαντωνάκης), olive oil traders of  Rethymno, Crete, in 1976 opened their first hotel outside of Rethymno, Rithimno Beach. Other hotels in Crete followed in the late 1970s to early 1980s. They bought 50% of Grecotel from Cypriot businessman Dimitris Pierides in 1986.

In the years leading up to the 2004 Summer Olympics in Athens, the owners made substantial investments which however did not yield the expected results. Thus, with the financial crisis of 2007–2008, the company came into difficulties and in 2012 had to be rescued by TUI Group.
The investments specifically concerned the hotels in the historical center of Athens, which fell victim to chronic degradation in the wake of the financial crisis, turning into "immigrant ghettos" rife with crime, coinciding with a drop in lodging nights in hotels there.

Within the Daskalandonakis family, there was a prolongued legal dispute over the control of the business, sparked by the financial difficulties, lasting from 2008 to 2017. Founder Nikos Daskalandonakis and his daughter Marie Sifounakis (wife of politician Nikolaos Sifounakis) won the case against his now-ex-wife and his other two children in Supreme Court decision 1340/2017.

In 2015, TUI sold its share of the company to the private owners, the Daskalantonakis family.
There was some speculation in Greek media regarding possible disputes over further investment plans as the reason for this decision.

Vassilis Menadakis was appointed general manager in 2015, replacing  George Karatzias.

See also
Tourism_in_Greece#Infrastructure
Association of Greek Tourism Enterprises

References

External links
agrecofarms.gr

Hotels in Greece
Hospitality companies of Europe
Hotel chains
TUI Group
Year of establishment missing